Valmet Vihuri (Finnish for Gale) was a Finnish advanced two-seat fighter trainer aircraft, serving in the Finnish Air Force between 1953 and 1959. Only a few airframes have survived, as in the Central Finland Aviation Museum in Finland.

History
In spite of their economic problems, the aircraft manufacturer Valmet began designing a new aircraft at the beginning of the 1950s, to replace the aging Finnish Air Force (FAF) VL Pyrys. Martti Vainio was the chief designer of the project. Most of the planning was made by the aeronautical engineers L. Hämäläinen and T. Mäntysalo in 1948–49. The Bristol Mercury, then being manufactured under license in Finland for the Bristol Blenheim bomber, was chosen as the engine, since it was readily available. The prototype (VH-1) made its first flight on 6 February 1951, in Tampere, piloted by captain Esko Halme. After successful test flights, the FAF ordered 30 production aircraft, called Valmet Vihuri II, on 27 February 1951. In the autumn of 1954, the Air Force ordered a further 20 aircraft of the developed version Valmet Vihuri III. All the aircraft of the third version were handed over to the Air Force on 15 January 1957.

Valmet built 51 Vihuris in three different models in Kuorevesi and Tampere. The aircraft had the registration codes VH-1 through VH-51.

Operational use

The Vihuri aircraft became the most-used aircraft in FAF service by the mid-1950s. The aircraft was subject to many accidents, and the press raised much concern over this. The safety of the Vihuri even became a matter for the government. In May 1959, the aircraft was permanently grounded. Attempts were made to sell the aircraft to Tunisia, without success.

After inspection, it became apparent that the type and its design were sound; most of the accidents were due to pilots' often grave violations of flight regulations, and the fact that all airframes were well worn by the end of the 1950s. The other problem was the engines. The engines used, Tampella Mercury, were recycled engines of wartime Bristol Blenheim bombers which were already worn out. The planes were sold for scrap to Moser OY. One airframe, VH-18, survives in the Central Finland Aviation Museum, and the fore fuselage of another, VH-25, is being restored. The canopies of the scrapped aircraft remain today as the roof windows of the Kuusakoski metal-recycling plant in Espoo.

Operators

Finnish Air Force

Surviving aircraft
The Central Finland Aviation museum is displaying the VH-18, which is the only preserved Vihuri. It gathered 802 flying hours, after which the aircraft served as an educational machine at the Air Force Academy in Kauhava.

Specifications (Valmet Vihuri II)

See also

References

Footnotes

Notes

Bibliography

 Bridgman, Leonard. Jane's All The World's Aircraft 1956–57, New York: The McGraw-Hill Book Company, 1956. 
 Kalevi Keskinen, Kari Stenman, Klaus Niska: Suomen ilmavoimien historia 14 - Suomalaiset hävittäjät, AR-Kustannus ky, 1990.

External links

 Pictures from the scrapping of the Vihuris

1950s Finnish military trainer aircraft
Valmet aircraft
Single-engined tractor aircraft
Aircraft first flown in 1951
Low-wing aircraft